Spermatodes is a genus of shield bugs belonging to the family Pentatomidae, subfamily Pentatominae.

Species
 Spermatodes australis (Schouteden, 1906)
 Spermatodes grossi McDonald, 1989
 Spermatodes parvus (Distant, 1910)
 Spermatodes variolosus (Walker, 1867)

References

 Rider D.A., 2004 - Family Pentatomidae - Catalogue of the Heteroptera of the Palaearctic Region

Pentatomidae genera
Eysarcorini